Henry Pease (4 May 1807 – 30 May 1881) was an English railway owner, peace campaigner and a Liberal politician who represented Durham South.

Details on Death

Cause and Date 
Pease died of an illness (Diagnosed 2 weeks before his death) in his home at 23, Finsbury Square, London. Members of his family were present when he passed peacefully in his sleep.

His Wills and Bequests 
(Dated 20 January 1859) Mr. Henry Pease left to Joseph Whitehall Pease the net personal estate being affirmed to be of the value of upwards of £360,000. To his wife Mrs. Mary Pease £2000 and an annuity of £500 for life, to then be reduced to £250 per annum. "If she is to marries again; she is also to have the right of residing at his mansion house, Piermont, with the use of the furniture, plates, pictures, effects and a carriage and horse for a twelvemonth after his decease". All of the residue of his real and personal estate to his said son, Mr. Henry Fell Pease.

Business
Pease was a director of the Stockton and Darlington Railway and was responsible for the foundation of the seaside resort of Saltburn-by-the-Sea.

Politics
He was, for a time, the Peace Society President and, in 1854, he visited the Tsar of Russia in an attempt to talk him out of the Crimean War. He also visited Napoleon III in the interests of peace.
Pease was elected MP  for Durham South in 1857 and held the seat until 1865. In 1867, Henry Pease was appointed the first Darlington Mayor.

Private life
Pease, a member of the Quaker Pease family of Darlington, was the fifth son of Edward Pease. An older brother of his was Joseph Pease. He was resident at Piermont, Darlington, and Stanhope Castle, Durham.

Pease married Anna Fell and they had one son Henry Fell Pease. He married a second time to Mary Lloyd and they had three sons and two daughters.

See also
 List of political families in the United Kingdom

References

External links 
 

1807 births
1881 deaths
Liberal Party (UK) MPs for English constituencies
UK MPs 1857–1859
UK MPs 1859–1865
People from Darlington
People from Stanhope, County Durham
Henry
North Eastern Railway (UK) people

Saltburn-by-the-Sea